Ultra B (ウルトラB, Urutora Bi) is a manga series by Fujiko A. Fujio (Motoo Abiko) that first made its debut in Chuokoron-Shinsha's Fujiko Fujio Land series of tankōbon books in 1984 and was released in individual tankōbon until 1989. In 1987, the manga was adapted into a 120-episode anime of the same name by Shin-Ei Animation which aired on TV Asahi from 4 April 1987 to 27 March 1989.
It is inspired by Doraemon.

Plot
One day, a mysterious alien baby named Ultra B from outer space comes to Earth, and a boy named Michio Suzuki finds him. He takes him as his own child, much to the surprise of his family. As he discovers he can talk (although not perfectly), walk, and do magic, and he causes havoc for Michio with his powers. Like Nobita Nobi from Doraemon (Another manga series from Abiko's friend Fujiko F Fujio), Michio does bad at work and is clumsy, so things go worse when it comes to UB's mischief, even though he's only a baby. The manga and anime tells the story of the duo and their adventures.

Cast
 Yuko Mita as Ultra B (Also known as UB, in Japanese ユビ, Yubi)
 Chiyoko Kawashima as Michio Suzuki
 Naoko Matsui as Takemi Aoba
 Shigeru Chiba as Tateo Tosaka
 Gara Tajashima as Kasumi
 Sukekiyo Kameyama as Daibutsu Tanyoika
 Kaneta Kimotsuki as Shinichi Suzuki
 Kazuyo Aoki as Dota Yukei
 Masako Nozawa as Kazuyo Suzuki
 Rei Sakuma as Doji

Music
Opening Theme Song - "Babibabibabibu Ultra B" (バビバビバビブー　ウルトラB)
Performed by Yuko Mita feat Morinoki Children's Chorus | Music composed by Shunsuke Kikuchi | Lyrics written by Fujiko Fujio A

Ending Theme Song - "Kiss Ultra B" (ウルトラBにチュッ!, Movie Only)
Performed by Bunkekana and Koorogi '73 | Music composed by Shunsuke Kikuchi | Lyrics written by Takada Hiroo

References

External links

1989 Japanese television series endings
Japanese children's animated comedy television series
Anime series based on manga
Fujiko Fujio A
Shin-Ei Animation
TV Asahi original programming